"Cartman Sucks" is the second episode of the eleventh season of the American animated television series South Park. It originally aired on March 14, 2007. The main plot deals with Eric Cartman's efforts to recover an incriminating photograph that may call his sexual orientation into question, whereas the subplot, which focuses on Butters Stotch, explores childhood gay conversion therapy.

Plot
Cartman has developed a hobby of getting Butters Stotch to spend the night at his house and taking degrading photos of him as he sleeps. The next morning Cartman then shows Stan, Kenny and Kyle a photo of him with Butters's penis in his mouth, thinking that this makes Butters homosexual. However, Kyle points out that a male who performs oral sex on another male is the one perceived to be the homosexual, thus making Cartman the homosexual. As a practical joke, Kyle then convinces a horrified Cartman that taking a similar picture with his and Butters's positions switched would "cancel out the gay polarity".

Cartman goes over to Butters's house, then tricks him into allowing himself to be blindfolded and opening his mouth. As he is about to insert his penis into Butters's mouth, Butters' dad Stephen walks in on them and panics. After Cartman flees without waiting to explain, Stephen declares that Butters is bi-curious. Butters, totally unaware of what Cartman was planning to do, just asks him what that means. Stephen explains that it means that Butters is "confused". Butters, having no idea what he is talking about, admits that this is so. Stephen takes him to Camp New Grace, a Christian conversion therapy camp, whose organizers repeatedly reinforce the idea that the boys there are "confused".

At camp, the boys are miserable, the counselors are uncaring, and suicide is common. Butters befriends his roommate and "accountabili-buddy", a nervous and insecure boy called Bradley. When camp authorities find Bradley's 1979 male underwear catalog they are both punished. After Bradley realizes that he has a crush on Butters, he comes to the conclusion that he is beyond hope and decides to end his life. Butters and the staff of the camp find Bradley on the outer ledge of a bridge and try to persuade him to come down. When Butters finds the staff to be unsympathetic, he excoriates them, telling them that he is sick of people telling him he is confused, and that he was never confused until he was brought to the camp. He also voices his belief that the staff's assertions of "confusion" are simply a projection of their own confusion. Somewhat encouraged by this expression of confidence and pride, Bradley decides not to commit suicide and comes down. Seeing that Butters is happy being bi-curious, Stephen admits that he is bi-curious as well and that he enjoys his curiosity. The statement prompts a shared laugh between the two, but Butters winds up legitimately confused as he has no idea what his father was referring to.

Meanwhile, having discovered that Kyle was tricking him, Cartman decides to throw away the picture of him with Butters's penis in his mouth and never bring it up again. However, Stan, Kyle and Kenny, pointing out that they already know about it, blackmail Cartman into being nice to them or they will tell everyone. Cartman refuses and decides to photoshop the picture so it would be Kyle with the penis in his mouth. When Cartman cannot find it, he convinces himself that Kyle has stolen it in order to show it at school during show and tell. Kyle's attempts to convince Cartman that he has not stolen it are unsuccessful, as are the other avenues through which Cartman attempts to recover it from him. Resolving to prevent Kyle from having the satisfaction of showing it off, Cartman himself shows a copy of the photo to the entire class during show-and-tell, attempting to pass it off as an 'artistic statement against the War In Iraq', but even Mrs. Garrison is shocked. Suddenly, Mr. Mackey comes to the classroom and relays a message to Cartman from his mother: she found the original photograph under his desk at home. Cartman's humiliation is completed as Kyle simply glares at him with a look of bored disdain.

Production
The scene in which Cartman tells the boys that he put Butters's penis in his mouth was cut from the sixth season episode "Asspen".

Reception
IGN gave this episode a score of 9.0 and said:
Whenever South Park builds an episode around Cartman's misdeeds, it's bound to be good. One of the best examples of this being "Scott Tenorman Must Die". In that classic episode, Eric's naivety got him in trouble. The same happens here, as he plays a prank that has unintended consequences – and gets in even bigger trouble when he believes Kyle's reasoning behind "canceling it out".

The episode was released on the two-disc DVD collection A Little Box of Butters.

Australian rating controversy
In 2011, the Australian Communications and Media Authority made a complaint against Austar for falsely rating the episode an M rating, instead of MA15+ (equivalent to TV-14 and TV-MA, respectively), as it featured strong sexual material and self-harm, which normally require an MA15+ classification. ACMA saw that the episode contained strong visual and verbal sexual references and, although they were stylized depictions of oral sex, their imagery was still considered to be strong for an M rating. Moreover, visual depictions of suicide, while justified by the storyline, were also deemed strong in nature, when the M classification only allows for moderate impact. Breaching the ASTRA Codes of Practice, Austar recognized that it had classified the episode incorrectly, given that the Classification Board previously classified the Episode MA15+ for the Season 11 DVD.

See also
 Conversion therapy
 Homosexuality and Christianity

References

External links
 "Cartman Sucks" Full episode at South Park Studios
 

Conversion therapy
LGBT-related South Park episodes
South Park (season 11) episodes
Television episodes about suicide
Animation controversies in television
LGBT-related controversies in animation
LGBT-related controversies in television
Obscenity controversies in animation
Obscenity controversies in television
Rating controversies in television
Television controversies in Australia